Tamahine is a 1963 British comedy film directed by Philip Leacock and starring Nancy Kwan, Dennis Price and John Fraser. It is a film about a Polynesian woman who believes she can change the culture of Hallow School, a British boys' boarding school. The story was filmed at Wellington College in county Berkshire.

The film had its World Premiere on 18 July 1963 at the Empire, Leicester Square in London's West End.

Plot
When her father dies, orphan teenager Tamahine is sent from her South Pacific island home to live with Charles Poole, her father's cousin and the headmaster of Hallow, a prestigious all-male school in England. Richard, Charles' son and school student, falls in love with her, but she considers him tabu because of the closeness of their family relationship. Another suitor is the art master, Clove, after he breaks up with Charles' daughter Diana.

Meanwhile, Tamahine has trouble adjusting to the puzzling social mores of her new home, exasperating Charles, but making him start to question his own joyless existence. In the end, Richard convinces Tamahine that their connection is distant enough that marrying him does not violate English tabus, while Clove resigns to go paint in a foreign land, accompanied by Diana. The film leaps ahead several years, showing a scruffily bearded Charles enjoying life on Tamahine's island, while Richard takes his place as headmaster, watched by Tamahine and their children.

Theme
For comparison, A French Mistress, three years earlier, (1960), used the same theme of a visiting foreign teacher at a British school causing a cultural clash.

Cast
 Nancy Kwan as Tamahine
 John Fraser as Richard Poole
 Dennis Price as Charles Poole
 Coral Browne as Mme. Becque, a former lover of Tamahine's father whom Tamahine visits on her way to England
 Dick Bentley as Storekeeper
 Derek Nimmo as Clove
 Justine Lord as Diana
 James Fox as Oliver, a schoolmate of Charles
 Michael Gough as Cartwright
 Allan Cuthbertson as Housemaster
 Howard Marion-Crawford as Housemaster
 William Mervyn as Lord Birchester
 Robin Stewart as Fiend
 Bee Duffell as Nun

References

External links

1963 films
1963 romantic comedy films
British romantic comedy films
Films about orphans
Films set in schools
Films scored by Malcolm Arnold
Films directed by Philip Leacock
1960s English-language films
1960s British films
CinemaScope films